Krol is a surname of several possible origins.

It may be a Dutch surname. It originally was a nickname of someone with curly hair (krul still means "curl" in Modern Dutch).

The name may also be a simplification of the Polish surname Król, the Belarusian/Ukrainian surname Krol', both literally meaning "king",  or the German surname Kroll.

Notable people with the surname include:

Krol
 Aaron Krol (1964-2011), Computer Programmer
  (1920–2015), German horn player and composer
 Ed Krol (born 1951), American internet pioneer and technology writer
 George A. Krol (born 1956), American diplomat
 Gerrit Krol (1934–2013), Dutch author, essayist and writer
  (born 1945), Dutch CDA politician
 Henk Krol (born 1950), Dutch journalist, publisher, and politician
 Ian Krol (born 1991), American baseball pitcher 
 Jack Krol (1936–1994), American baseball coach and manager
 Joe Krol (1915-1993), Canadian ice hockey player
 Joe Krol (1919–2008), Canadian Football League player
 John Krol (1910–1996), American Roman Catholic Cardinal
 Katharine L. Krol, M.D., FSIR, FACR, American interventional radiologist
 Leendert Krol (born 1939), Dutch field hockey player.
 Louisa John-Krol, Australian folk/pop musician
 Melvin Krol (born 1998), German football forward
 Mike Krol (born 1984), American musician and graphic designer 
 Petr Krol (born 1965), Czech weightlifter
 Petra Krol (fl. 1970s), East German slalom canoeist
 Ruud Krol (born 1949), Dutch footballer and coach
 Sebastiaen Jansen Krol (1595–1674), Dutch Director-General of New Netherland
 Thomas Krol (born 1992), Dutch speed skater
 Torsten Krol, Australian novelist
 Mike Krol (born 1984), American musician

Król
Król is a Polish surname meaning "king" and may refer to:
 Aleksandra Król (born 1990), Polish snowboarder
  (born 1983), Polish racing cyclist
 Jan Król (born 1950),  Polish economist and politician
 Joachim Król (born 1957), German actor of Polish descent
 Kamil Król (born 1987), Polish football striker
 Krzysztof Król (born 1987), Polish football defender
 Marcin Król z Żurawicy (c. 1422–1460), Polish mathematician, astronomer, and physician
 Paweł Król (born 1960), Polish international footballer
 Piotr Marek Król (born 1974), Polish politician
 Rafał Król (born 1989), Polish football midfielder
 Stanisław Król (1916–1944), Polish fighter pilot
 Wacław Król (1915–1991), Polish military pilot 
 Wiesław Król (born 1938), Polish hurdler
 Władysław Król (1907-1991), Polish football and ice hockey player
 Zdzisław Król (1935–2010), Polish Roman Catholic priest

Krol'
  (1879–1939), Soviet Belorussian neurologist
  (1862–1942), Ukrainian-Russian ethnologue, publisher and jurist

See also
 Kroll
 Krol Ko at Angkor, Cambodia

References

Dutch-language surnames
Polish-language surnames

Surnames from nicknames